The Social Security Administration Act 1992 (c 5) is the main piece of legislation dealing with the administration of social security benefits in the United Kingdom.

History 
There has been various types of support for those without income in the UK since medieval times but 'modern' social security began in the mid 20th century.  Various Acts of Parliament and Statutory Instruments dealt with the rules, but the current regulation is covered, in the main, by this much amended Act.

Amendments 

There has been a number of amendments since the Act was first passed, the main ones being the Social Security Administration (Fraud) Act (1997 ch. 47), the Social Security Act (1998 ch. 14), the Social Security Fraud Act (2001 ch.11), and the Welfare Reform Act (2007 ch.5),.

Statutory Instruments 

Although the base legislation is contained within the acts, most of the actual rules and regulations come within a plethora of Statutory Instruments.  The best place to view these is via (National Archives), a UK Governmental website.

Offences 

The main offences created by the act (and subsequent amendments) are :
s.111 :  failure by specified body to provide information ;
s.111A :  dishonestly making false claims or withholding information about relevant changes ;  and
s.112 : knowingly making false claims or withholding information about relevant changes.

Section 111A is an either way offence, the others are summary only.

Prosecution - legal points 
Where cases of benefit fraud result in criminal prosecution of an individual, in England & Wales such prosecutions are generally brought either under section 112 Social Security Administration Act 1992 (where no dishonesty is alleged) or under s111A of the same Act (where dishonesty is alleged).  There are a number of legal cases relevant to prosecutions under these sections.  Key points are dealt with in more detail in technical articles on benefit fraud.

The penalties for benefit fraud may be mitigated where it can be shown that the defendant would have been entitled to other forms of financial benefit, such as UK Tax Credits, had an appropriate claim on the true facts been lodged at the time.

A person convicted of benefit fraud may be held to have a 'criminal lifestyle' in confiscation proceedings under Parts 2, 3 & 4 of the Proceeds of Crime Act 2002.

Notes

United Kingdom Acts of Parliament 1992